Bruno Keil (8 July 1859 in Havelberg – 23 March 1916 in Leipzig) was a German classical philologist.

He studied classical philology, archaeology and Germanistics in Berlin, Bonn and Greifswald, obtaining his doctorate in 1884 at the University of Greifswald with a highly regarded thesis on Isocrates. As a student, his influences were Ulrich von Wilamowitz-Moellendorff, Georg Kaibel and Rudolf Hercher. He took scientific travels to Italy, Spain and France, and beginning in 1888, worked at the Sophiengymnasium in Berlin. In 1890 he became an associate professor at the University of Strasbourg, where he gained a full professorship in 1901. From the autumn of 1913 until his death, he taught classes at the University of Leipzig.

In addition to Isocrates, his academic research including studies of the ancient rhetoricians Aeschines and Demosthenes, the Second Sophistic orator Aelius Aristides and the satirist Lucian. He made contributions in the fields of Greek epigrammatic poetry, Greek metrology and numismatics, and in his later years, he focused his energies towards ancient Greek epigraphy.

Selected works 
 "Analectorum Isocrateorum Specimen", 1884.
 "Analecta Isocratea", 1885.
 Die solonische Verfassung in Aristoteles Verfassungsgeschichte Athens, 1892 – The Solonian Constitution in Aristotle's constitutional history of Athens.
 "Aelii Aristidis Smyrnaei quae supersunt omnia", 1898 – edition of Aelius Aristides. 
 Beiträge zur Geschichte des Areopags, 1910 – Contributions to the history of the Areopagus.
 Über Lukians Phalarideen, 1913 – On Lucian's Phalaris.
 Anonymus argentinensis; fragmente zur geschichte des Perikleischen Athen aus einem Strassburger papyrus, 1920 – Anonymous argentinensis, fragments on the history of Periclean Athens from a Strasbourg papyrus.

References 

1859 births
1916 deaths
People from Havelberg
German classical philologists
Academic staff of the University of Strasbourg
Academic staff of Leipzig University